Procetichthys kreffti is a species of flabby whalefish found at depths of around  in the Atlantic Ocean. It is thought to inhabit the mid Atlantic ridge. It is the only known member of its genus.

References
 

Cetomimidae
Monotypic fish genera
Fish described in 1989